Truman Harrison Hoag (April 9, 1816 – February 5, 1870) was a U.S. Representative from Ohio.

Born in Manlius, New York, Hoag attended the public schools.
He moved to Syracuse, New York, in 1832 and was employed as a clerk in a store and later in the canal collector's office.
He moved to Oswego, New York, in 1839 and was employed for a commission merchants company, moving to Toledo, Ohio, in 1849 as agent of the same firm.
Later became engaged in transportation and in mercantile pursuits.
He also engaged in the manufacture of illuminating gas and of coke.
He was an unsuccessful candidate for mayor in 1867.

Hoag was elected as a Democrat to the Forty-first Congress and served from March 4, 1869, until his death in Washington, D.C., on February 5, 1870.
He was interred in Forest Cemetery in Toledo, Ohio.

See also
List of United States Congress members who died in office (1790–1899)

Sources

1816 births
1870 deaths
Politicians from Toledo, Ohio
19th-century American politicians
Burials in Ohio
Democratic Party members of the United States House of Representatives from Ohio